Amiria Juanita Mahanna Denelle Rule ( Marsh; born 17 May 1983) is a retired female rugby union player. She represented  and Canterbury. She was a member of the squad that won the 2002 and 2006 Rugby World Cup's.

Rule was the youngest Black Fern to make her international debut at the age of 17, on 23 September 2000 against Canada at Winnipeg. In 2006, she was named the New Zealand Women’s Player of the Year. She was part of the team that won the 2013 series against .

Rule missed out on the 2010 Rugby World Cup due to a knee injury. She led the Black Ferns in her only captaincy role for the 2014 Laurie O'Reilly Cup, her side won 38–3. She later made selection to the 2014 tournament where the Black Ferns missed out on playing in the semifinals for the first time. She scored the final try in her sides 63–7 win over Wales in the semi-final of the 5th–8th place playoff.

Rule currently teaches at Avonhead Primary School in Christchurch.

References

External links
Black Ferns Profile
AIG Profile

1983 births
Living people
New Zealand women's international rugby union players
New Zealand female rugby union players
Place of birth missing (living people)
Canterbury rugby union players
Rugby union centres